Dennerlein is a German surname. Notable people with the surname include:

Barbara Dennerlein (born 1964), German hard bop, post-bop, and jazz organist
Fritz Dennerlein (1936–1992), Italian swimmer
Jerry Dennerlein (1915–1966), American football player

German-language surnames